The following are the national records in track cycling in China maintained by China's national cycling federation: Chinese Cycling Association.

Men

Women

References

External links
 Chinese Cycling Association web site 

China
Records in track cycling
Track cycling
track cycling